Peter Hadley (fl. 1377–1388) of Exeter, was an English politician.

He was a Member (MP) of the Parliament of England for Exeter in January 1377, 1378, November 1384, February 1388 and September 1388, for Plympton Erle in 1371 and September 1388, and for Tavistock in 1381.

References

Year of birth missing
Year of death missing
English MPs January 1377
Members of the Parliament of England (pre-1707) for Exeter
Members of the Parliament of England for Plympton Erle
Members of the Parliament of England for Tavistock
English MPs 1378
English MPs November 1384
English MPs February 1388
English MPs September 1388
English MPs 1371
English MPs 1381